The Ellerslie Eagles are a rugby league club based in Ellerslie, New Zealand. The club was founded in 1912 and competes in Auckland Rugby League competitions. Its premier team competes in the Sharman cup. The club celebrated its centenary Queen's Birthday weekend, 2012.

History

1910s - 30s
The club was formed as the Ellerslie Wanderers at a meeting in April 1912 at the Ellerslie Hotel. However, with the outbreak of World War I in 1914 the club went into temporary recess for four years.

The club was reestablished on 26 July 1919 as the Ellerslie United Rugby League Club. With its reestablishment, the club adopted the Red, Blue and White colours that it still currently uses.  They didn't however field a team until August 28, 1920 in the fourth grade competition, which was nearing the end of the season at the time. They also fielded a third grade side in a friendly match with Kingsland Athletic on September 25.

In 1925 they won their first ever grade trophy by taking out the B Division. They won it again in 1927 and earned the right to play in the promotion relegation match with Grafton. They defeated them 11-3 and qualified to play in the A Grade (Monteith Shield - the forerunner to the Fox Memorial) for 1928. In their first ever A grade match they upset Ponsonby 15-8 at Carlaw Park with tries by Davis, Allen, and Dance, and 3 conversions by Shand. They however finished in last place with a 3 win, 9 loss record. In 1929 they went win less but beat Point Chevalier 5-0 in the promotion-relegation match to remain in the top grade. In 1930 they finished second to last with a 4-18 record. In 1931, at request of the Auckland Rugby League, an amalgamation of the Ellerslie, Otahuhu and Mangere clubs took place, but all plans of this merger were abandoned before the year ended. Their short-lived merger with Otahuhu saw another last placed finish with a 1-1-10 record. The Auckland Rugby League decided at this point to reduce the number of first grade teams after concerns about the falling standard of play in recent seasons and Ellerslie were dropped from the top grade. They were not to regain a place in the Fox Memorial grade for several years.

1940s
In May, 1942 Mr. G. Chapman of the Ellerslie club was made a life member of the Auckland Rugby League due to his 30 years of service to the game in Auckland.

1950s - 60s
The club had a golden period in the 1950s, claiming the 1955 Roope Rooster and Stormont Shield, the 1956 Roope Rooster, the 1957 Fox Memorial and Rukutai Shield and the 1959 Roope Rooster and Stormont Shield. The club also played against three clubs from the New South Wales Rugby League premiership, losing to the Balmain Tigers 35–7 in 1956, defeating the Manly-Warringah Sea Eagles 16–15 in 1958 and losing to the St. George Dragons 10–11 in 1959.
 
During the 1960s the Auckland Rugby League instituted a districts programme and Ellerslie, City Newton and Eastern Suburbs combined to form Eastern Districts. The combination won almost every trophy between 1960 and 1963 before the clubs regained their separate identities. In 1968 the Pakuranga club was formed as a feeder club to Ellerslie. Former New Zealand national rugby league team representative Maurie Robertson was appointed as coach in 1970.

1970s - present
The club officially adopted the Eagles name in 1971. During the 1980s the club bounced between the first and second divisions, with Sharman Cup (second division) wins in 1981 and 1986. They again lifted the Sharman Cup in 1991 and 1992. The club was affiliated to the Auckland City Vulcans during the 1994 Lion Red Cup and joined the Eastern Tornadoes side with the advent of the Bartercard Cup in 2000. In 2004 the club left the Tornadoes to become part of the Otahuhu-Ellerslie Leopards side in the Bartercard Cup.

The club celebrated its centenary on Queen's Birthday weekend 2012.

Notable players

Ellerslie's best player ever is arguably Cyril Eastlake. Other Kiwi representatives include Ivan Littlewood, Craddock Dufty (1930), Wally Somers, Brian Campbell, Bruce Castle, Gary Phillips, Graham Brown, Bruce Castle, Ken McCracken, Jim Patterson, Ray Sinel, Brian Clark, Rob Orchard, Ken Stirling, Chris Jordan, Doug Gailey, Lyndsay Proctor, Gary Kemble, Logan Swann, Murray Eade, Tame Tupou and Kieran Foran.

Both Sean Hoppe and Kevin Iro played for the Glen Innes Falcons, a feeder club to Ellerslie during the 1980s.

Other notable players include Aaron and Stuart Lester, Doc Murray, Tongan internationals David Fisiiahi and Filimone Lolohea, Glen Fisiiahi and Liam Foran.

Ellerslie Senior Team Records (1912-1943)
The season record for the most senior men’s team in the club.

All time top point scorers (1924, 1928-1931)
The point scoring lists are compiled from matches played in matches from the first grade championship, the Roope Rooster, Phelan Shield, and Sharman Cup only. One off matches and exhibition matches are not included. The statistics for the combined Ellerslie-Otahuhu team of 1931 are included. Matches in the B Division are not included due to a lack of records available at this stage.

Ellerslie grade championships (1912-41)
 1924 6th Grade B (Ellerslie B)
 1925 B Grade (2nd division) - Norton Cup
 1927 B Grade (2nd division) - Norton Cup
 1932 Senior Schoolboys
 1934 6th Grade
 1936 3rd Grade
 1939 Intermediate Schoolboys
 1941 7th Grade

References

External links
Official Website

 
Rugby clubs established in 1912
1912 establishments in New Zealand